1 Yr Live is a live performance album by American noise rock band Pussy Galore, released in 1986 by Shove Records.

Track listing

Personnel
Pussy Galore
 Bob Bert – drums, percussion
 Julie Cafritz – electric guitar, vocals
 Neil Hagerty – electric guitar, vocals
 Cristina Martinez – electric guitar, vocals
 Jon Spencer – lead vocals, electric guitar

Release history

References

External links 
 1 Yr Live at Discogs (list of releases)

1986 live albums
Pussy Galore (band) albums